The Joseph Kushner Hebrew Academy is a coeducational Modern Orthodox Yeshiva Day School located in Livingston, New Jersey.  The Academy is dedicated towards developmental education and religious growth, for both boys and girls from Pre-Kindergarten through Grade 8. The affiliated Rae Kushner Yeshiva High School serves students in grades nine through 12.

Schooling
The Joseph Kushner Hebrew Academy seeks to instill in its students a love and commitment for the Torah of Israel, the People of Israel and the Land of Israel.

The school houses a program of the SINAI Special Needs Institute, an organization dedicated to serving the educational, psychological and emotional needs of Jewish children and young adults. Children of below to above average intelligence with different degrees of learning disability, with a wide variety of behavioral characteristics are served, whose needs could not be addressed by traditional Jewish day school programs and curricula.

History
The school was founded by Charles Kushner, named in honor of his father Joseph Kushner.

In 2020, the Joseph Kushner Hebrew Academy was the recipient of $1–2 million dollars in Paycheck Protection Program loans from the US Small Business Administration.

Administration
Core members of the school's administration are

 Rabbi Eliezer Rubin - Head of School 
 Mr. Howard Plotsker - Associate Principal
 Mr. Gary Berger - Assistant Principal, Guidance and Student Services
 Jeremy Halpern and Dov Lando - co-presidents

References

External links
 Joseph Kushner Hebrew Academy Website
Data for Joseph Kushner Hebrew Academy, National Center for Education Statistics

Jewish day schools in New Jersey
Livingston, New Jersey
Modern Orthodox Jewish day schools in the United States
Modern Orthodox Judaism in New Jersey
Orthodox yeshivas in New Jersey
Private elementary schools in New Jersey
Private middle schools in New Jersey
Schools in Essex County, New Jersey